John Markoff (born 1942) is an American sociologist working as a distinguished professor of sociology and history at the University of Pittsburgh.

Education 

Markoff received a Bachelor of Arts from Columbia University in 1962 and a PhD from Johns Hopkins University in 1972.

Career 
Prior to taking a position at University of Pittsburgh in 1972, Markoff taught at the City College of New York. He has also done research at the Pablo de Olavide University in Seville.

He has published extensively in sociological, historical, and political science journals. He states that his research "concerns the history of democratization, considered as a multi-continental process across several centuries".

Representative publications 
The Great Wave of Democracy in Historical Perspective (1994), 
Waves of Democracy: Social Movements and Political Change (1996), 
The Abolition of Feudalism: Peasants, Lords, and Legislators in the French Revolution (1996), 
Revolutionary Demands: A Content Analysis of the Cahiers de Doléances of 1789 (1998),

See also
History of democracy

References

External links
John Markoff webpage at University of Pittsburgh

1942 births
Living people
University of Pittsburgh faculty
Revolution theorists
American sociologists